Maureen Osborne Flannigan (born December 30, 1973) is an American actress.  She is perhaps best known for her role as teenager Evie Ethel Garland on the fantasy sitcom Out of This World, which ran from 1987 to 1991.

Early life 
Flannigan was born in Inglewood, California. She was discovered at age 11 while on the beach with her father by an advertising agent from Mattel.

She graduated from Notre Dame High School in Sherman Oaks, California.

Flannigan graduated with a Bachelor of Arts degree from the USC School of Theater. She appeared in productions of  Macbeth, The Crucible and William Saroyan'sThe Cave Dwellers and directed a production Beth Henley's Am I Blue? She was also a member of USC's ski team.

Film and television
Flannigan made her television debut in a guest starring role in an episode of Highway to Heaven. Two years later, in 1987, Flannigan landed the role of Evie Garland in the first-run syndication children's comedy series Out of This World, starring with Donna Pescow and Joe Alaskey. She stayed with the show until its cancellation in 1991.

Flannigan had a recurring role on The WB's 7th Heaven as Shana Sullivan, the girlfriend of Matt Camden. She was in the ABC soap opera Push, playing swimmer Erin Galway.  She has also appeared on Star Trek: Deep Space Nine, ER, Law & Order: Special Victims Unit, Starved, Close to Home, Kindred: The Embraced and 90210.

Flannigan has also acted in films.  She starred in Teenage Bonnie and Klepto Clyde (1993), National Lampoon's Last Resort (1994), Written in Blood (2003), A Day Without a Mexican (2004), and Homecoming (2005).  In 2010 she appeared in the film Do Not Disturb, which she also co-produced.

Flannigan currently runs her own production company.

Filmography

Film

Television

References

External links
 
 

1972 births
Living people
20th-century American actresses
21st-century American actresses
Actresses from Los Angeles
American child actresses
American film actresses
American television actresses
Actresses from Inglewood, California
University of Southern California alumni